Super Robot - Suffer Reboot is the name given to a series of three sculptures by Filipino artist Toym Leon Imao. The sculptures, made from 2014 to 2016, are each inspired by a specific Japanese mecha animated television series which were popular in the Philippines in the 1970s.

Sculptures
Super Robot - Suffer Reboot is the collective name for three separate sculptures. The names of each sculpture are alliterations. All of them were first exhibited at the steps of the Palma Hall at the University of the Philippines Diliman.

Symbolism
The sculptures were made to symbolize the sufferings and injustices experienced by Filipinos, with an emphasis towards the time of martial law during Ferdinand Marcos' presidency, when many Japanese mecha animated series became popular among Filipino children. By 1979, Marcos banned every mecha series considered to have violent content inappropriate for children. Imao, who used to watch Voltes V and other mecha series, made the sculptures to symbolize his anger when those series' broadcasts were halted by Marcos: "At first it was only because he deprived me of a favorite TV character. And then a sort of political awakening happened. Suddenly, I was affected by what grownups were talking about: Martial law."

References

2014 sculptures
2015 sculptures
2016 sculptures
Martial law under Ferdinand Marcos
Pop art